Whitley may refer to:

Places
United Kingdom
Whitley, Berkshire, a suburb of Reading
Whitley, Cheshire, a village near Warrington
Whitley, Coventry, a suburb of Coventry, West Midlands
Whitley, Essex, near Birdbrook
Whitley, Wigan, Greater Manchester, a location
Whitley, North Yorkshire, a village
Whitley, South Yorkshire, a location
Whitley, Wiltshire, a village
Whitley Bay, a town in Tyne and Wear, known as Whitley until the 19th century
Whitley Lower and Whitley Upper, West Yorkshire

United States
Whitley City, Kentucky
Whitley County, Indiana
Whitley County, Kentucky
Whitley Township, Moultrie County, Illinois

In the military
 Armstrong Whitworth Whitley, a British bomber of the Second World War
 , a British destroyer in commission in the Royal Navy from 1918 to 1921 and from 1939 to 1940

Schools
Whitley Secondary School, Bishan, Singapore
Whitley Abbey Community School, Coventry, England
Whitley College, University of Melbourne, Australia

People
 Whitley (surname)
 Whitley (singer), singer/songwriter from Melbourne, Australia
 Whitley Gilbert, fictional character from the 1980s sitcom A Different World
Whitley Strieber, American science fiction and horror writer

See also
 
 Witley, village in Surrey
 Whiteley, community in the county of Hampshire, England
 Wheatley (disambiguation)